The 1955 winners of the Torneo di Viareggio (in English, the Viareggio Tournament, officially the Viareggio Cup World Football Tournament Coppa Carnevale), the annual youth football tournament held in Viareggio, Tuscany, are listed below.

Format
The 16 teams are organized in knockout rounds, all played single tie.

Participating teams
Italian teams

  Atalanta
  Bologna
  Fiorentina
  Genoa
  Lanerossi Vicenza
  Milan
  Sampdoria
  Triestina
  Udinese
  Viareggio

European teams

  Bayern München
  Partizan B.
  Hajduk Split
  First Vienna
  Austria Wien
  Chiasso

Tournament fixtures

Champions

Footnotes

External links
 Official Site (Italian)
 Results on RSSSF.com

1955
1954–55 in Italian football
1954–55 in Yugoslav football
1954–55 in Austrian football
1954–55 in German football
1954–55 in Swiss football